Nyaho Nyaho-Tamakloe is a Ghanaian football administrator and politician. He was the president of the Ghana Football Association from 2001 to 2005 and Ghana's ambassador to Serbia and Montenegro from 2005 to 2009. He is a founding member of the New Patriotic Party.

Early life and education 
Nyaho-Tamakloe was born on 7 May 1942 at Adabraka, a suburb of Accra. He studied at Zion College in Keta prior to entering Charles University, Prague, Czechoslovakia to train as a medical doctor in the 1960s.

Career 
After his studies abroad, Nyaho-Tamakloe joined the Ghana Armed Forces as a medical practitioner. He later left for Nigeria and the United States of America to practice. in 1972 Nyaho-Tamakloe joined the Ghana Armed Forces during the National Redemption Council era. He was subsequently arrested for an alleged coup plot to overthrow the then head of state General. Ignatius Kutu Acheampong.

In the 1980s he joined the Accra Hearts of Oak Management Chair and Board, and in 1992 he became a founding member of the New PatrioticParty. In 2001, he was voted the president of the Ghana Football Association and in 2005 he was appointed Ghana's ambassador to Serbia and Montenegro. He still held this position as ambassador to Serbia after the independence of Montenegro and he ended it up in 2009.

Publication 
In 2013, Nyaho-Tamakloe published his autobiography: Never Say Die!:The Autobiography of a Ghanaian Statesman, (2013)

See also 
 Ghana Football Association

References 

1942 births
Ewe people
Ghanaian diplomats
Living people
New Patriotic Party politicians
Presidents of the Ghana Football Association
Ghanaian football chairmen and investors
Ambassadors of Ghana to Serbia
Ambassadors to Serbia and Montenegro
Charles University alumni